The Norwegian Music Critics Award (Den norske Musikkritikerprisen or Kritikerprisen) is awarded by the Norwegian Critics' Association (Norsk Kritikerlag) and has been awarded every year since 1947. For other Norwegian Critics Awards, see the Norwegian Literature Critics Award, which has been awarded every year since 1950, the Norwegian Theatre Critics Award, which has been awarded every year since 1939 (except 1940-45), and the Norwegian Dance Critics Award, which has been awarded every year since 1977.

Annual Norwegian Music Critics Award Winners
 1947/48 – Eva Gustavson
 1948/49 – Eva Prytz
 1949/50 – Randi Helseth
 1950/51 – Ny norsk ballett (for dance art)
 1951/52 – Anne Brown
 1952/53 – not awarded
 1953/54 – Arne Hendriksen
 1954/55 – Waldemar Johnsen
 1955/56 – Ørnulf Gulbransen
 1956/57 – Robert Levin
 1957/58 – Det norske solistkor
 1958/59 – Alf Andersen
 1959/60 – Ingrid Bjoner
 1960/61 – Ragnar Ulfung
 1961/62 – Henny Mürer (for dance art)
 1962/63 – not awarded
 1963/64 – Kari Frisell
 1964/65 – Kjell Bækkelund (did not want to receive the award)
 1965/66 – Arvid Fladmoe
 1966/67 – Bjarne Larsen
 1967/68 – Eva Knardahl
 1968/69 – Arve Tellefsen
 1969/70 – Robert Riefling
 1970/71 – Birgitte Grimstad
 1971/72 – Edith Thallaug
 1972/73 – Finn Ludt
 1973/74 – Jens Harald Bratlie
 1974/75 – Einar Steen Nøkleberg
 1975/76 – Vessa Hansen
 1976/77 – Den Norske Blåsekvintett
 1977/78 – Else Dehli
 1978/79 – Okko Kamu
 1979/80 – Terje Tønnesen
 1980/81 – Aage Kvalbein
 1981/82 – Knut Skram
 1982/83 – Mariss Jansons
 1983/84 – Truls Otterbech Mørk
 1984/85 – Oslo Trio
 1985/86 – Anne Gjevang
 1986/87 – Lars Anders Tomter
 1987/88 – Leif Ove Andsnes
 1988/89 – Håkon Austbø
 1989/90 – Solveig Kringlebotn
 1990/91 – Terje Kvam
 1991/92 – Elisabeth Norberg-Schulz
 1992/93 – Ole Kristian Ruud
 1993/94 – Grieg Trio
 1994/95 – Arild Helleland
 1995/96 – Vertavokvartetten
 1996/97 – Stein Winge
 1997/98 – Randi Stene
 1998/99 – Christian Eggen
 1999/00 – Oslo Strykekvartett
 2000/01 – Halgeir Schiager
 2001/02 – Peter Herresthal
 2002/03 – Toril Carlsen
 2003/04 – Rolf Lislevand
 2004/05 – Henning Kraggerud
 2005/06 – Rolf Gupta
 2006/07 – Terje Stensvold
 2007/08 – Stefan Herheim
 2008/09 – not awarded
 2009/10 – Grete Pedersen
 2010/11 – Truls Mørk and Håvard Gimse

References

Norwegian music awards

de:Kritikerprisen (Norwegen)
no:Kritikerprisen
nn:Den norske Kritikerprisen
ru:Премия Ассоциации норвежских критиков
sv:Kritikerpriset (Norge)